Horcher is a surname. Notable people with the surname include:

Darrell Horcher (born 1987), American mixed martial artist
Paul Horcher (born 1951), American politician